"Last Exit to Springfield" is the seventeenth episode of the fourth season of the American animated television series The Simpsons. It originally aired on the Fox network in the United States on March 11, 1993. The plot revolves around Homer Simpson becoming president of the Springfield Nuclear Power Plant's trade union and leading the workers of the plant in a strike in order to restore their dental plan so that he does not have to buy braces for Lisa.

The episode was written by Jay Kogen and Wallace Wolodarsky, and directed by  Mark Kirkland. The episode contains several cultural references and Dr. Joyce Brothers guest stars as herself. "Last Exit to Springfield" received widespread acclaim from both fans and critics and has frequently been cited as one of the best episodes of the entire series.

Plot
Mr. Burns sits in his office awaiting the arrival of Chuckie Fitzhugh, the leader of the Springfield chapter of the "International Brotherhood of Jazz Dancers, Pastry Chefs and Nuclear Technicians" trade union, who has mysteriously disappeared after promising to clean up the union. While perusing Fitzhugh's proposed contract, Burns becomes disgusted with its demands and reminisces about simpler times when disgruntled workers were simply walled up in coke ovens at his grandfather's command. He then decides to challenge the union by arbitrarily revoking their dental plan.

Meanwhile, at Painless Dentistry, the Simpson children are getting their teeth checked. It is discovered Lisa needs braces. When Marge informs Homer, he tells her that the dental plan the union won during a strike will cover the cost. But later, at a union meeting, Carl announces that the newest contract requires them to give up their dental plan in exchange for a free keg of beer. Homer slowly comprehends that giving up their dental plan would require him to pay for Lisa's braces and jumps into action, reminding everyone how their dental plan has helped them all.

Carl proposes that Homer be the new union president and he is promptly elected by a nearly unanimous vote. Burns watches Homer on his hidden camera, and is intimidated by his energy. He invites Homer to his office with the intent of bribing him, but Homer misconstrues Mr. Burns's sly innuendos as sexual advances. Homer declares that he is not interested in "backdoor shenanigans" and promptly leaves; Burns wrongly infers that Homer is honest and incorruptible. Meanwhile, after learning the family has no insurance to pay for invisible braces, Lisa's dentist fits her with the cheapest (and ugliest) braces available, causing her self-esteem to drop.

Burns sends hired goons to the Simpson house in order to take Homer back to his manor to negotiate. While Burns is setting the agenda for the discussion, Homer is struck by the urgent need to use the restroom. He asks Burns where the restroom is and leaves, but his delayed attempts to find it lead Burns to conclude that Homer is a tough negotiator who is unwilling to hear him out. At a later union meeting, Homer tries to resign, tired of meeting with Burns. The union misinterprets his frustration, and the members nearly unanimously decide to strike. Burns is undeterred by the strike and tries several methods of breaking it up but fails. On an edition of Kent Brockman's talk show, Burns threatens dire events if the strike is not concluded.

Burns and Smithers march to a secret room in the Power Plant and turn off the power for the entire town. The strikers do not lose hope and begin to sing. Burns, confident he has broken the union's spirit, steps out on his balcony to hear their reaction but is disarmed by their unity and optimism. Burns finally calls a meeting with Homer to concede their demands on one condition: that Homer resign as union president. Homer celebrates madly, leading Burns to finally realize that Homer is not the "brilliant tactician" he thought he was. With the Simpson family insured again, Lisa gets her perfect new braces and she, the Simpson family, and the dentist gather, laughing—because the dentist has forgotten to turn off the nitrous oxide.

Production

The idea for this episode came from Mike Reiss, who thought it would be funny if the plant went on strike. The writers of the episode, Jay Kogen and Wallace Wolodarsky, would later add the dental plan aspect of the plot. During the production of this episode, an ABC camera crew was allowed into the rewrite room, which Al Jean says he regrets because they were working on stage direction, and they came off as not being very funny.

The producers originally asked Anthony Hopkins and Clint Eastwood to provide the voice of the dentist, Dr. Wolfe, but they both turned the role down. Anthony Perkins was eventually cast in the role, but died before his recording session. In the end, the role went to Simpsons regular Hank Azaria. As well, the original panelist on Smartline was supposed to be O. J. Simpson, but he turned it down, much to the relief of the writers when Simpson was later tried for murder.

Cultural references

The title of the episode is an homage to Hubert Selby Jr.'s novel Last Exit to Brooklyn, one subplot of which involves the corruption and downfall of a union leader during a strike. The body of the union president, Chuckie Fitzhugh, is seen buried under a football field, an homage to the mystery surrounding the whereabouts of Jimmy Hoffa and his alleged burial at New Jersey's Giants Stadium. Mr. Burns' outfit in the flashback to his childhood is based on Buster Brown. Homer's imagination of a life of organized crime is based on Don Fanucci's first appearance in The Godfather Part II, accepting donuts rather than a necklace and an orange.

Lisa has a nitrous oxide-induced hallucination that echoes The Beatles film Yellow Submarine, which Al Jean says had to be changed slightly for legal reasons. This included changing the name of the short sequence to "purple submersible"; Paul McCartney calls her "Lisa in the Sky", while George Harrison notes "no diamonds though". This is a reference to the Beatles song "Lucy in the Sky with Diamonds". The scene where Lisa acquires her monstrous braces, laughs maniacally and breaks her mirror is based on a scene from the 1989 Tim Burton film Batman where Jack Napier discovers his transformation into the Joker.

When Homer is escorted by the hired goons into what appears to be Burns' conservatory, a Burns-headed bird (presumably a vulture) is sitting in front of the screen, which then flies away. This is a reference to the cockatoo in Citizen Kane. The page Mr. Burns reads from the monkey's typewriter is a reference to the first line of A Tale of Two Cities.  The episode features a sample of "Classical Gas", a popular piece of incidental music by Mason Williams played by Lisa on a request from Lenny. The sequence of Mr. Burns and Smithers going through multiple doors to get to the main power switch, and the music accompanying it, is a parody of the opening credits of Get Smart except for the part with the book case and twin fireman poles which is a reference to the original television series of Batman, simultaneous with this the score referencing the theme by Danny Elfman. Before Mr. Burns shuts off the power to the town in response to the strike, he says, "From Hell's heart I stab at thee" which is a reference to Captain Ahab's curse, from the novel Moby-Dick. The workers' resistance to the power outage, and Mr. Burns's response, is a parody of How the Grinch Stole Christmas. The scene where Homer spins on the floor and sounds "woo-woo-woo!" excitedly in response to Mr. Burns' concession to the strike is a reference to Curly Howard's antics on The Three Stooges.

Reception
In its original broadcast, "Last Exit to Springfield" finished 19th in ratings for the week of March 8–14, 1993, with a Nielsen rating of 13.7, equivalent to approximately 12.8 million viewing households. It was the highest-rated show on the Fox network that week.

The episode is generally ranked as being one of the best of all time and is on a number of Top 10 lists; the BBC stated it is "frequently cited as the show's best-ever episode". An Entertainment Weekly article from January 2003 looking back at the top 25 episodes of the series chose the episode as the show's greatest, saying "this episode is virtually flawless, the product of a series at the height of its creative powers -- when the satire was savage and relevant" and "the stuff of syndication legend: Burns facing down brilliant labor kingpin Homer Simpson; Homer Simpson facing down his own brain (DENTAL PLAN!/Lisa needs braces!); Grampa rattling on about wearing onions on his belt. Last Exit is a glorious symphony of the high and the low, of satirical shots at unions." In 2020, Al Jean acknowledged "Last Exit to Springfield" as an episode many consider to be a favorite.

In his book, Planet Simpson, Chris Turner calls it the best episode of the series, saying "Episode 9F15 of The Simpsons should be taught in schools, in history, economics, social studies, literature and art class. It's flawless". He also called it "the funniest half-hour in TV history", and provided a full analysis of the episode, only criticizing the chalkboard and couch gags. He maintains that he chose the episode as best ever before Entertainment Weeklys list was published.

In 2003, to celebrate the show's 300th episode, USA Today published a top 10 chosen by the webmaster of The Simpsons Archive, which had this episode in first place. The BBC website says, "This fine episode contains several of our favourite sequences ... A classic, and the series' most marked expedition into the surreal - up to this point." Today, who listed the episode as their favorite, stated, "This is the episode that every self-respecting Simpsons geek must be able to recite verbatim."

Michael Moran of The Times ranked the episode as the sixth-best in the show's history. Screen Rant called it the best episode of the fourth season and the second greatest episode of The Simpsons (behind "Homer's Enemy").

Director Mark Kirkland considers the episode to be one of the most surreal episodes that he has worked on because it has a lot of story crammed into it, many parodies and contains several visual sequences. Al Jean has also called it one of the "craziest" episodes. Homer's line "uh... Yeah" after being asked if he found the bathroom is one of Jay Kogen's favorite Simpsons jokes.

Legacy
The scene in the episode in which Mr. Burns shows his room with a thousand monkeys working at a thousand typewriters, a reference to the infinite monkey theorem, has inspired a real-life experiment about the theorem. The episode has become study material for sociology courses at University of California Berkeley, where it is used to "examine issues of the production and reception of cultural objects, in this case, a cartoon show", and to figure out what it is "trying to tell audiences about aspects primarily of American society, and, to a lesser extent, about other societies."

Throughout the episode, Lisa is seen playing a guitar and singing alongside the power plant workers. The song, named "Union Strike Folk Song" and originally written by Jeff Martin, has been adapted and sung for actual protests in Argentina in 2017, particularly during a controversy between employees from the Clarín Group and CEO Héctor Magnetto.

References

Bibliography

External links

1993 American television episodes
Television episodes about elections
The Simpsons (season 4) episodes
Works about the labor movement